The Quartier Saint-Pierre is the heart of the old town of Saint-Pierre-lès-Calais, which was merged with the town of Calais in 1881.

It is centered on the church of St. Pierre, in front of which a market is held on Saturday mornings, and on the labor exchange.

The economy of the town of Saint-Pierre focused on the lace industry, that of Calais on its harbor and on fishing around Courghain.

The Gare de Calais-Ville was originally the station of Saint-Pierre-lès-Calais, opened in 1848 by the Chemin de Fer du Nord, 40 years before the union of Calais with Saint-Pierre. The bridge over the railway marks the boundary between the two ancient cities, and even today marks the boundary between the old industrial city and the port city.

Calais
Hauts-de-France region articles needing translation from French Wikipedia